The 1927–28 Illinois Fighting Illini men's basketball team represented the University of Illinois.

Regular season
The 1927-28 season produced the only losing campaign in the 14 year tenure of head coach Craig Ruby at the University of Illinois.  Having only one returning senior on a team predominantly consisting of Juniors, Ruby entered his sixth season as head coach of the Fighting Illini with an overall record of 50 wins and 33 losses.  This season also produced the Ruby's only losing season in the Big Ten with a conference record of 2 wins and 10 losses.  The starting lineup included captain Everett Olson at center, Ernest Dorn and Earl H. Drew at forward, and future head coach Douglas R. Mills, Keston J. Deimling and Andrew R. Solyom at guard.

Roster

Source

Schedule

|-	
!colspan=12 style="background:#DF4E38; color:white;"| Non-Conference regular season
|- align="center" bgcolor=""

|-	
!colspan=9 style="background:#DF4E38; color:#FFFFFF;"|Big Ten regular season

Bold Italic connotes conference game
												
Source

Awards and honors

References

Illinois Fighting Illini
Illinois Fighting Illini men's basketball seasons
Illinois Fighting Illini
Illinois Fighting Illini